DICE is a ticketing software company based in London, United Kingdom. Its web and mobile technology products enable users (often referred to by the company as fans) to search, browse and buy tickets to all kinds of live events, including concerts, festivals, comedy shows and other types of performances or talks. DICE gained popularity as a ticketing app for its strong stance against scalping, implementing guardrails within its products to limit fraud and price gouging. DICE also develops technology products for live show organisers and promoters for them to manage event marketing and better understand their audiences.

During the global COVID-19 pandemic, DICE temporarily pivoted as a live streaming service where fans could buy tickets to access private shows from artists like Kylie Minogue, Bicep, Lewis Capaldi or Nick Cave. DICE moved on to acquire live music broadcaster Boiler Room in 2021. 

In September 2021, DICE completed its Series-C funding, raising $122 million with SoftBank Vision Fund, Nest co-founder and iPod inventor Tony Fadell as well as French billionaire entrepreneur Xavier Niel. Early investors include DeepMind and Ustwo.

Founder

Phil Hutcheon founded DICE in 2014. Prior to founding DICE, Hutcheon spent over 10 years working in the music industry running Modular Recordings and latterly his own record label, management and events company Deadly People. The company is based in De Beauvoir, in Dalston, London with other offices in Europe and North America. In September 2017, DICE launched into the United States with events in San Francisco and Los Angeles, California.

Services

Discovery feed 
Fans using the DICE app can search, browse and buy tickets in seconds for upcoming live shows. Spotify and Apple Music integrations allow fans to sync up their artist preferences for the app to suggest event recommendations on its homepage. DICE has built its own proprietary recommendation engine to power events being displayed on the each user's homepage, making DICE unique to every fan.

Secured mobile tickets 
Tickets are purchased within the app and exist on the user's smartphone as a QR code which also includes the date, time and location of the event. Depending on events, tickets can be either transferred to other users or resold through the waiting list feature. Unlike regular ticketing platforms, tickets bought on DICE need to be activated in-app prior to be scanned, this leads to QR codes only being displayed for a limited amount of time, right before the event start time and the ticket being scanned.

Waiting list and reselling system 
Customers can add themselves to a waiting list for sold-out shows. If users are no longer able to attend a show they can return their tickets to DICE; these tickets are then passed on those who have added themselves to the waiting list on a first-come, first-served basis. As the ticket purchased exists only within the app, it is necessary to have it installed in order to be allowed entry to the relevant event.

All tickets sold on DICE are sourced directly from labels, promoters and venues; the company does not participate in secondary ticketing. 

As of 2023, the DICE app is available in Western Europe (United Kingdom, France, Spain, Portugal, Italy, Germany) as well as North America (United States). Some shows are occasionally available in other territories like India or Australia. The app is available in six languages.

DICE Live Awards 
Since 2016, DICE organises the DICE Live Awards, a ceremony awarding best live music act showcased on the platform. “The DICE Live Award is just about the artists. No dinner, no long speeches, no other awards… just an opportunity to recognise the brilliance of an artist who has truly broken through with amazing live performances. There’s nothing like it.Being a great artist isn't only about creating music in a studio, but also having the charisma and talent to deliver performances that people will remember for years to come.” - Phil Hutcheon (CEO) and Andrew Foggin (Global Head of Music), DICE

Industry awards

References

External links
 

Online companies of the United Kingdom
British companies established in 2013
Ticket sales companies